The 2013 European Athletics Team Championships was the 4th edition of European Athletics Team Championships, first named European Athletics Team Championships and not only European Team Championships as from the 1st edition (Leiria 2009) to the 3rd edition (Stockholm 2011), took place on 22 and 23 June 2013.

Calendar

Super League 
Place: Gateshead International Stadium, Gateshead, Great Britain

Participating countries

 
 
 
 
 
  Italy

Men's events

Women's events

Score table

Final standings

Note: The competition was originally won by Russia but after the doping disqualification of Yekaterina Sharmina and points being reallocated, it was overtaken by Germany and Great Britain.

First League 
Place: Morton Stadium, Dublin, Ireland

Participating countries

Men's events

Women's events

Score table

Final standings

Second League 
Place: Darius and Girėnas Stadium, Kaunas, Lithuania.

Participating countries

Men's events

Women's events

Score table

Final standings

Third League 
Place: – SNP Stadium, Banská Bystrica, Slovakia.

Participating countries

 Athletic Association of Small States of Europe()

Men's events

Women's events

Score table

Final standings

Notes

References

External links
 

European Athletics Team Championships
Team
European
Sport in Gateshead